Louis H. Renfrow (October 5, 1896–December 22, 1979) was a Military Aide to the President (1947-1949) during the presidency of Harry S. Truman. He served as Chief Liaison and Legislative Officer, Selective Service System from 1946 to 1948. From 1949 to 1950, Renfrow served as Special Assistant to the Secretary, Department of Defense, and from 1950 to 1957 was Deputy Director, Selective Service System. He originally was a member of the Missouri National Guard, serving in the dental corps. He was a brigadier general. Renfrow was born in Cairo, Illinois.

References

1896 births
1979 deaths
People from Cairo, Illinois
Military aides to the President of the United States
Missouri National Guard personnel
Brigadier generals
Truman administration personnel